Jacques Minkus (December 15, 1901 – September 17, 1996), of New York City, emigrated to the United States in 1929 and established stamp counters for postage stamp collectors at numerous department stores in the United States.

Philatelic activity
Minkus established his first stamp counter at Gimbels department store in Manhattan in 1931. He was successful in this method of selling stamps and continued to open stamp counters in department stores until the 1960s, when he had opened thirty eight counters.

Minkus also published a stamp catalog titled Minkus New World Wide Stamp Catalog starting in 1955. In addition to the catalog, he published over one hundred stamp albums for collectors.

Honors and awards
The Service to Philately Award was presented to Minkus by the American Stamp Dealers Association in 1966. In 1993 he was awarded the Luff Award for Exceptional Contributions to Philately. In 1997 he was elected to the American Philatelic Society Hall of Fame.

Legacy
The Minkus catalog is still used by some collectors today, as it contains material not included in other stamp catalogs.

See also
 Minkus catalogue
 Philatelic literature

External links 
 Robert McG. Thomas Jr., "Jacques Minkus, 94, Dies; Brought Stamps to Masses", The New York Times, September 19, 1996
 Is the Minkus Supreme the "Goldilocks" Album for WW Classical Collectors? Friday, April 10, 2015.

1901 births
1996 deaths
Polish emigrants to the United States
Philatelic literature
American philatelists
American stamp dealers
Businesspeople from New York City
20th-century American businesspeople
American Philatelic Society